HL may refer to:

In arts and entertainment
 Half-Life (series), a video game series by Valve
 Half-Life (video game), the first game in that series
 Horseland, an online community and virtual game
 Harry Styles and Louis Tomlinson, part of the popular boyband One Direction known as HL when referred to together

Businesses 
 Hangars Liquides, an electronic music label
 Hargreaves Lansdown, a British investment company
 Hitachi-LG Data Storage, an optical disc drive manufacturer
 Hogan Lovells, an international law firm
 Houlihan Lokey, an international investment bank 
 Hovedstadens Lokalbaner, a Danish local railway company

In linguistics 
 , a Latin-script digraph
 Reduction of /hl/ to /l/ in Old/Middle English
 Voiceless alveolar lateral fricative, a sound sometimes represented as

Science, technology, and mathematics 
 HL gas, a mixture of sulfur mustard and lewisite
 Half-life, in nuclear physics
 Hectolitre, a unit of volume
 Hessdalen light, an unexplained light seen in Norway
 Hodgkin's lymphoma, a highly treatable hematological malignancy ("blood cancer")
 Hotline, a telecommunications link
 Hydrogen line, a spectral line
 Hypotenuse Leg, a postulate of geometry
 HL, an amateur radio call sign prefix in South Korea

Other uses 
 Croatian Labourists – Labour Party, a political party in Croatia
 Headline, a text indicating the nature of the article below it
 Heilongjiang, a province of China (Guobiao abbreviation HL)
 Hit list (disambiguation)
 House of Lords, the upper house of the Parliament of the United Kingdom
 Higher Level, a level of course difficulty in the International Baccalaureate Diploma Programme
 Hospitality Lawyer, a hospitality resource website founded by Stephen Barth